Jürgen Ruhfus (August 4, 1930 Bochum – 25 February 2018) was a German lawyer, diplomat, West German Ambassador to the United States, German Ambassador to the United States and Secretary of State.

Life and career
His father was an engineer. Ruhfus studied law and economics in Munich and Münster, as well as an exchange student in Denver, Colorado. In 1950, he joined the CDU. After Ruhfus had filed in 1955, his first state exam, he was attaché in the Foreign Office and accompanied the Foreign Minister Heinrich von Brentano (CDU). In the meantime, he was vice consul at the Consulate in Dakar, before Ruhfus was higher in 1959 in the Foreign Service.

From 1960, he served as Counsellor at the West German Embassy in Athens. With the publication "The constitutional position of the Court of Belgium and the Federal Court", he earned a Dr. jur. in 1964. 
From 1964 to 1970, he worked at the Press Department of the Foreign Office, took over the management Ruhfus in 1966.

From 1970 to 1973, he was first West German ambassador in Nairobi. Ruhfus went back to the Foreign Office, where his activity was in international affairs and he was also department manager later. From 1976, he was employed as Head of the Department II of the Federal Chancellery. Chancellor Helmut Schmidt (SPD) made Juergen Ruhfus his foreign policy and security adviser.

With the succession of Hans Hellmuth Ruete in 1980, he was ambassador in London. 
By the end of the shake-up, Ruhfus came back again in 1983 to the Foreign Office, where he was Permanent State Secretary in July 1984. 
In November 1987, he was back into the diplomatic service. Ruhfus followed Günther van Well as German ambassador in Washington. He held this office until the end of 1992, when he retired.

He was Chairman of the German-British Society, and on the advisory board of the German American Heritage Foundation. 
Between 1992 and 2001, he was a member of the Supervisory Board of Adam Opel AG.

Jürgen Ruhfus is married and has three daughters.

Works
Die staatsrechtliche Stellung des Rechnungshofs von Belgien und des Bundesrechnungshofs, Rechts- u. staatswissenschaftliche Fakultät, Münster, 1964
Aufwärts. Erlebnisse und Erinnerungen eines diplomatischen Zeitzeugen 1955 bis 1992, EOS-Verlag, St. Ottilien, 2006,

References

External links
"Jürgen Ruhfus", German wikipedia

1930 births
2018 deaths
Ambassadors of Germany to the United States
Ambassadors of Germany to the United Kingdom
Ambassadors of Germany to Kenya
People from Bochum
Jurists from North Rhine-Westphalia
Government ministers of Germany
Christian Democratic Union of Germany politicians
Knights Commander of the Order of Merit of the Federal Republic of Germany